Mount Frankland National Park is a national park in the South West region of Western Australia,  south of Perth. The park is part of the larger Walpole Wilderness Area that was established in 2004, an international biodiversity hotspot.

Geography
It covers an area of 371.22 square kilometres in the low granite hills to the north of the town of Walpole.

Mount Frankland (411 metres), known as Caldyanup to the aboriginal inhabitants, is a granite peak which offers panoramic views across the landscape. There is a fire lookout atop the mountain. The mountain was named in 1829 by Thomas Braidwood Wilson after George Frankland, who was then Surveyor General of Tasmania.

The park extends from northwest to southeast. It is bounded on the north by Mount Frankland North National Park, on the east by Mount Roe National Park, on the south by Mount Frankland South National Park, and on the west by Shannon National Park.

Climate
Most rain falls between May and August, but unlike drier parts of southwestern Australia, showers are not infrequent even during the summer.

Flora and fauna
The park is covered largely by forests of karri (Eucalyptus diversicolor) and red tingle (Eucalyptus jacksonii), two of the world's largest trees. The three tingle species are unique to the area between the park and the coast and the only eucalypts to be buttressed, a feature which reflects the moist conditions prevailing within the park.

Low heathland is the dominant vegetation on the thin soil over the park's many granite outcrops.

Recreation
There are several walking trails in the park, ranging from wheelchair-accessible to difficult. 

An unsealed road, usable by conventional vehicles, provides auto access to a car park within the park. There are picnic areas with gas barbecues and toilets 100 metres from the car park, and a treetop-level wilderness lookout further on.

See also
 Protected areas of Western Australia

References

External links
 Mount Frankland National Park, Parks and Wildife Service, Government of Western Australia

National parks of Western Australia
Protected areas established in 1988
1988 establishments in Australia
Warren bioregion